Eye Contact is the debut album by Jay Beckenstein released in 2000.

Track listing 
"Sunrise" (Chieli Minucci) 5:09
"The Other Side" (Jay Beckenstein, Chuck Loeb) 4:49
"Northline" (Jay Beckenstein, Chuck Loeb) 4:27
"Eye Contact" (Chuck Loeb) 4:55
"West Side Cool" (Jay Beckenstein, Jason Miles) 4:07
"Heart and Mind" (Jay Beckenstein) 5:33
"Goodbye Pork Pie Hat" (Charles Mingus) 4:31
"Monsoon" (Jay Beckenstein) 6:29
"Black Market" (Joe Zawinul) 5:27
"Turnaround" (Jay Beckenstein, Bakithi Kumalo) 3:50
"Lookin' Up" (Jay Beckenstein) 5:23

References

External links
https://web.archive.org/web/20070626081215/http://www.jaybeckenstein.com/eye-contact.html

2000 debut albums
Windham Hill Records albums